"Perfect Moment" is a song originally by Polish singer Edyta Górniak from her first international album, Edyta Górniak (1997). It was written by Jim Marr and Wendy Page and produced by Christopher Neil. A cover by British singer and actress Martine McCutcheon reached number one on the UK Singles Chart in 1999.

Martine McCutcheon version

English actress Martine McCutcheon covered "Perfect Moment" and released it as her debut single on 5 April 1999. Her version reached number one on the UK Singles Chart that same month, launching her music career after her leaving BBC soap EastEnders, in which she played the character Tiffany Mitchell from 1995 to 1999. Over 12 million viewers tuned in to watch the final scenes of her tragic death after being hit by a car. The song also reached number three in Ireland and peaked at number 10 on the Eurochart Hot 100. It was included on her debut album, You Me & Us (1999). The music video for the song was filmed in New York City.

Critical reception
AllMusic editor John Lucas placed McCutcheon alongside her idols Barbra Streisand and Celine Dion. He stated that "her voice soars on the chart-topping power ballad". Nigel Williamson from Billboard noted it as a "sweeping ballad in the style of Celine Dion". Can't Stop the Pop described it as a "orchestral, sweeping ballad" and a "real showcase for her flexibility as a pop vocalist. The first verse and chorus are strikingly ethereal; there’s a calm serenity as the song shimmers and throbs alongside the gentle, warm vocals. If there was any part of Tiffany Mitchell in the song, then this is where she wakes up at the pearly gates of heaven." Tom Ewing from Freaky Trigger noted that the song "starts with a gentle, gauzy arrangement that suggests some kind of celestial waiting room." He added it as "unashamedly, open-heartedly sentimental".

Caroline Sullivan from The Guardian called it "a titanic belter of a ballad", noting the "diva's vibrato". Liverpool Echo said "Perfect Moment" is "one of those soaring, Streisand-like ballads that no one admits to liking but mysteriously sells hundreds of thousands of copies." A reviewer from NME described it as "total rapture". Sunday Mirror commented, "Bound to be a huge hit. Sounds a bit like a breathy Kylie. Which is no bad thing." Sunday Mercury noted, "It's surprising that Martine McCutcheon should release a ballad as her first single, rather than a catchy pop hit. But what's even more surprising is how good it is." They added, "It's a soulful number, sung with feeling by someone blessed with a superb voice. It's a slow burner, but it wasn't long before I was humming it to myself." They also concluded, "Goodbye Albert Square, hello Top of the Pops and a number one hit."

Music video
The music video for "Perfect Moment" begins with McCutcheon standing in front of a microphone, in a room overlooking a New York City street. Sometimes she also sits against the wall or lies on a sofa while she sings. Occasionally there are black-and-white clips of McCutcheon at different sites in the city. More than halfway through the video, the singer is seen standing on a roof, singing to the microphone, overlooking the city. As the video nears its end, McCutcheon lies on the couch again, singing the last lines of the song.

Charts

Weekly charts

Year-end charts

Certifications

References

 

1990s ballads
1997 songs
1999 debut singles
Martine McCutcheon songs
Number-one singles in Scotland
Pop ballads
Songs written by Jim Marr
Songs written by Wendy Page
UK Singles Chart number-one singles
Virgin Records singles